Martigny is the capital of the district of Martigny in the canton of Valais in Switzerland formed by the merger of Martigny-Bourg and Martigny-Ville in 1964.

Martigny may also refer to:

France
Martigny, Aisne, in the Aisne department
Martigny, Manche, in the Manche department
Martigny, Seine-Maritime, in the Seine-Maritime department
Martigny-Courpierre, in the Aisne department
Martigny-le-Comte, in the Saône-et-Loire department
Martigny-les-Bains, in the Vosges department
Martigny-les-Gerbonvaux, in the Vosges department
Martigny-sur-l'Ante, in the Calvados department
Saint-Germain-de-Martigny, in the Orne department

Canada
Martigny River, Québec

Switzerland
Martigny-Combe, a municipality in the canton of Valais